Leucoptera nieukerkeni is a moth in the family Lyonetiidae. It is endemic to Greece.

The larvae feed on Acer monspessulanum. They probably mine the leaves of their host plant.

External links
bladmineerders.nl
Fauna Europaea

Leucoptera (moth)
Moths of Europe